Hemileia coffeicola is a plant pathogen which effects coffee plantations in central to western Africa, particularly in Cameroon and São Tomé and Príncipe. It is a grey or orange rust fungus whose urediniospores are ornamented with warts or spines. Its sori are found scattered over leaf surfaces particularly on the entire underside of the leaf giving it the appearance of powdery blotches. It can be distinguished from the very similar Hemileia vastatrix by the way in which the sori are scattered over the leaf surface rather than being found in distinct patches. The presence hyphae measuring up to 20–30 µm in diameter can also be used to distinguish H. coffeicola from H. vastatrix. It was first recorded on Coffea arabica in Cameroon in 1932. Infected leaves eventually turn yellow and are desiccated.

References

External links 
 Index Fungorum
 USDA ARS Fungal Database

Teliomycotina
Coffee diseases